The Sudanese Ambassador in Washington, D. C. is the official representative of the Government in Khartoum to the Government of the United States.

List of representatives 

Sudan–United States relations

References

Ambassadors of Sudan to the United States
United States
Sudan